Polina Andreyevna Miller (born 9 June 2000) is a Russian sprinter competing in the 200 and 400 metres. She finished fourth in the 200 metres at the 2018 World U20 Championships.

International competitions

Personal bests
Outdoor
200 metres – 23.15 (+0.3 m/s, Smolensk 2018)
400 metres – 50.76 (Tomblaine 2021)
Indoor
200 metres – 23.77 (Moscow 2018)
400 metres – 50.71 (Saint Petersburg 2022)

References

2000 births
Living people
Russian female sprinters
European Games competitors for Russia
Athletes (track and field) at the 2019 European Games
Authorised Neutral Athletes at the World Athletics Championships
Russian Athletics Championships winners
21st-century Russian women